Isaac Bullard (July 10, 1774 – June 18, 1808) represented Dedham, Massachusetts in the Great and General Court. He was also town clerk for a total of three years, having first been elected in 1784. He was also elected five times as selectman, beginning in 1773. Bullard was the first treasurer of Norfolk County, serving from 1793 to 1808.

Bullard was born July 10, 1774. He was a deacon of the First Church and Parish in Dedham. In this capacity, he leased out plots of the church's land for 999 year leases. His ancestor was William Bullard. He died June 18, 1808.

References

Works cited

Members of the colonial Massachusetts General Court from Dedham
1774 births
1808 deaths
Dedham, Massachusetts selectmen
Dedham Town Clerks
Deacons at First Church and Parish in Dedham
County treasurers of Norfolk County, Massachusetts